Hathras Kila railway station is a freight Terminus train station in Hathras, Uttar Pradesh. Its code is HRF. It serves Hathras city. The station consists of one platform. The platform is not well sheltered. It lacks many facilities including water and sanitation. This station is mainly used for cargo purposes and have rail yard in the station's premises.

See also 
 Hathras Junction railway station
 Hathras City railway station
 Hathras Road railway station
 Tundla Junction railway station
 Aligarh Junction railway station

References

External links

Railway junction stations in India
Railway stations in Hathras district
Allahabad railway division
Hathras